The Harrisonburg Methodist Church in Harrisonburg in Catahoula Parish, Louisiana was listed on the National Register of Historic Places in 2015.

Built in 1853–54, the church is located at 105 Pine Street, a major road through Harrisonburg, just off the east end of a bridge crossing the Ouachita River.  After a flood in 1927, the church was modified in 1929 and further expanded in 1957.

It is a one-story Classical Revival-style church with a covered portico and a "witch
s hat" cupola upon which a crucifix rises.

See also
National Register of Historic Places listings in Catahoula Parish, Louisiana

References

National Register of Historic Places in Louisiana
Neoclassical architecture in Louisiana
Churches completed in 1854
Catahoula Parish, Louisiana
Methodist churches in Louisiana
1854 establishments in Louisiana
Neoclassical church buildings in the United States